Caenopedina depressa is a species of sea urchins of the Family Pedinidae. Their armour is covered with spines. Caenopedina depressa was first scientifically described in 1927 by Koehler.

References

Animals described in 1929
Pedinoida